Talty is a surname found in County Clare, Ireland. It is an Anglicized form of the Gaelic "Ó Tailtigh" ‘descendant of Tailteach’. Other surnames with the same origin are Tully, Tally, MacTully, MacAtilla, Flood and possibly Floyd. The Ó Tailtigh family were physicians to the O'Conors, Kings of Connacht and also to the O'Reillys of Breffny in County Cavan.

References
 Talty in GoIreland  
Irish Families, Their Names and Origins by Edward MacLysaght, (Dublin, 1958)
  Ireland's DNA

Surnames
Irish families
History of County Clare
Connacht